In mathematics, the HM-GM-AM-QM inequalities state the relationship between the harmonic mean, geometric mean, arithmetic mean, and quadratic mean (aka root mean square or RMS for short). Suppose that  are positive real numbers. Then

 

These inequalities often appear in mathematical competitions and have applications in many fields of science.

Proof 
There are three inequalities between means to prove. There are various methods to prove the inequalities, including mathematical induction, the Cauchy–Schwarz inequality, Lagrange multipliers, and Jensen's inequality. For several proofs that GM ≤ AM, see Inequality of arithmetic and geometric means.

AM-QM inequality

From the Cauchy–Schwarz inequality on real numbers, setting one vector to :

 hence . For positive  the square root of this gives the inequality.

HM-GM inequality
 
The reciprocal of the harmonic mean is the arithmetic mean of the reciprocals , and it exceeds  by the AM-GM inequality.  implies the inequality:

The n = 2 case 

When n = 2, the inequalities become  for all  which can be visualized in a semi-circle whose diameter is [AB] and center D.

Suppose AC = x1 and BC = x2. Construct perpendiculars to [AB] at D and C respectively. Join [CE] and [DF] and further construct a perpendicular [CG] to [DF] at G. Then the length of GF can be calculated to be the harmonic mean, CF to be the geometric mean, DE to be the arithmetic mean, and CE to be the quadratic mean. The inequalities then follow easily by the Pythagorean theorem.

External links 
Data

Inequalities